Leif Jørgen Aune (7 June 1925 – 20 July 2019) was a Norwegian economist and politician for the Labour Party.

Biography 
From 1971 to 1972, in the first cabinet Bratteli, Aune was appointed state secretary in the Ministry of Local Government and Labour. He left the position when the first cabinet Bratteli fell in 1972, and from 1973 to 1978 he served as Minister of Local Government and Labour in the second cabinet Bratteli and the cabinet Nordli. He resigned on 11 January 1978.

Outside politics, he graduated as cand.oecon. in 1951 and worked mainly with regional development. He was director of the Regional Development Fund from 1978 to 1990. In addition, he was a member of the board of Christiania Bank og Kreditkasse, Ullevål University Hospital as well as various other councils, boards and agencies.

References

1925 births
2019 deaths
Labour Party (Norway) politicians
Ministers of Local Government and Modernisation of Norway
Norwegian state secretaries
Norwegian economists
Politicians from Bodø
Innovation Norway people